Ambobactin is an depsipeptide antibiotic with the molecular formula C59H77N13O19. Ambobactin is produced by the bacterium Streptomyces ambofaciens.

References 

Antibiotics
Depsipeptides